Regal International Airport Group Co., Ltd. is a Chinese listed company based in Meilan Airport, Haikou. The company is 50.19% owned by Haikou Meilan International Airport Co., Ltd., a company related to Hainan Airlines, Grand China Air, HNA Infrastructure Investment Group, HNA Group,  and China Development Bank.

Regal International Airport Group was formerly known as HNA Infrastructure Co., Ltd. and Hainan Meilan Airport Co., Ltd..

HNA Infrastructure is the operator of Haikou Meilan International Airport.

History
On 30 December 2016 HNA Infrastructure announced a recapitalization and a plan to acquire the runway of Meilan Airport from the parent company in an all-share deal; sister company HNA Infrastructure Investment Group would be introduced as minority shareholder. In July 2017, it was announced that the company would develop the airport into an aviation hub and a duty-free shopping paradise.

On 9 July 2018, it was approved by the extraordinary general meeting that the company would renamed to Regal International Airport Group Co., Ltd..

Subsidiaries
 Meilan Airport Assets Management (100%)
 Hainan Meilan International Airport Cargo (51%)

Equity interests
 HNA Airport Holdings (24.5%) - a subsidiary of HNA Airport Group for 50.2% stake; HNA Airport Holdings owned Sanya Phoenix International Airport Co., Ltd.
 Haikou Decheng Industrial and Development (30%)

Shareholders

 Haikou Meilan International Airport (50.19%)
 Oriental Patron Financial Group (19.94%)
 Pacific Alliance Asia Opportunity Fund (6.93%)
 UBS (5.78%)
 Deutsche Bank (3.84%)
 Greenwoods Asset Management (2.93%)
 JPMorgan Chase (2.88%)
 Handelsbanken (2.41%)
 general public (5.1%)

As at 13 October 2016, the shareholders of Haikou Meilan International Airport were HNA Airport Group, an indirect subsidiary of HNA Infrastructure Investment Group (19.58%), state-owned bank China Development Bank (18.88%), state-owned company Hainan Development Holdings (16.65%), a private company (14.99%), a subsidiary of HNA Group (11.9%), listed company Hainan Airlines (7.88%), another private company based in Yangpu (4.78%), listed company China Southern Airlines (3.21%) and China National Aviation Fuel Supply a joint venture of China National Aviation Fuel Group, Sinopec Marketing and PetroChina Marketing  (2.08%).

Haikou Meilan International Airport Co., Ltd. itself owned 7.08% shares of Hainan Airlines as the third largest shareholder as cross ownership. The largest shareholder of Hainan Airlines is Grand China Air for 35.34% shares, which HNA Group is the second largest shareholder of Grand China Air for 23.11% stake. (Haikou Meilan International Airport owned 8.30% stake of Grand China Air as the fourth largest shareholder) HNA Group owned 4.88% shares of Hainan Airlines directly and an additional 4.25% held by subsidiary Changjiang Leasing; the largest shareholder of Grand China Air was Hainan Development Holdings for 24.97% stake.

References

External links
 

Airport operators of China
H shares
Transport companies established in 2000
Chinese companies established in 2000
Companies listed on the Hong Kong Stock Exchange
Companies based in Hainan
Government-owned companies of China
Companies owned by the provincial government of China
Civilian-run enterprises of China
Organizations based in Haikou
Privatization in China